Matilda Petersen (born 17 February 1991) is a Swedish female badminton player.

Achievements

BWF International Challenge/Series
Women's Singles

 BWF International Challenge tournament
 BWF International Series tournament
 BWF Future Series tournament

References

External links
 

1991 births
Living people
Swedish female badminton players
21st-century Swedish women